Story 9 Months Ki ( Story of 9 months) is an Indian television drama series on Sony TV. It premiered on 23 November 2020. Produced by Rangrez Television Works, it stars Sukirti Kandpal and Aashay Mishra. The show ended on 23 April 2021.

Plot 
Alia Shroff is a headstrong woman who has planned everything and achieved it. She lives with her dad Gautam Shroff, who is always a show-off, has never cared for her and is divorced from her mother Nandini Sharma because apparently she left them to become a painter (this also led Alia to grow a strong dislike for her), which was later proven to be a false story made by Gautam. Alia is married to Veer Malhotra and wants a child. Veer, however, is having an affair with Alia's friend Nitya. Alia catches him cheating and divorces him. She now plans her baby via IVF. On the other hand, Sarangdhar Pandey, an aspiring writer from Mathura, who has a very rigid-minded father, watches an interview of her, gets inspired and so comes to Mumbai, with the support of his mother, to become a writer. Although he told everything about his journey and other things to his mother, his father didn't know anything more than the fact that he left home to become a successful writer.

Sarang gets a job in Alia's company "Direct Dil Se" (DDS) as an Office Runner by mistake and is staying at a house shared by few other people. Later on, on her business advisor's advice, Alia appoints him as a writer. Rahul, Alia's secretary, was given the task to find her a suitable sperm donor for the IVF procedure and gets one, but the donor he finds cancels the offer at the last minute due to personal issues. Unbeknownst to Alia, he then tricks Sarang into donating. This helping of Alia, however, has an adverse effect on Rahul's own love-life as when he was so caught up in the chaos, Mala, another employee of Alia and Rahul's love interest, comes to the conclusion of him being homosexual and she plans on marrying an NRI she met online; the marriage, however, to Rahul's delight, was later cancelled because of the groom's shallow thinking and shaming of Mala, which was discovered and brought to light by Alia herself.

Meanwhile, Kavya, Sarang's friend, on being encouraged by her regular visitor Nandini, confesses her love for him but Sarang didn't really see her in the same way around. After Alia gets pregnant, Rabia, Alia's childhood best friend and doctor, gets to know about the blunder and informs her. Sarang too gets to know about it shortly after. This revelation is a difficult one for him as he was not ready to become a father – neither emotionally, nor financially. He was traumatized by his childhood experiences with his father and grew up deciding never to become a father, but after a lot of soul searching, Sarang decides he will help raise the child. In the meantime, Alia gets to know she is pregnant with twins. When the media gets to know that her pregnancy is through IVF (due to an accidental slip up by Sarang), people protest against her but Sarang fights hardly to protect her and their baby (here, he doesn't know that he is going to become father of twins).

In Mathura, Sarang's sister, Kumkum, gets pregnant with the other parent being her husband Suraj (on the day of Kumkum's wedding, Brij had an argument with her father-in-law which resulted in an incomplete marriage ceremony,so have to stay at his house rather than that of her husband's, although she still secretively meets him), while the eldest sister Kusum and her husband are thrown out of the house because she raises her voice against her father's ill-treatment of women, but is called back later on.

Now to get rid of Sarang (as she doesn't want him as the father figure to her kids), Alia begins looking for his weaknesses and comes to the conclusion that they are Kavya (whom she thought was his girlfriend but later realised wasn't) and Brij Mohan Pandey (Sarang's father). She recommends him to a famous film producer Mr. Mehta to make him resign from DDS and also tried to give him money to leave her. Around the same time, Brij discovers that Kamleshwari is in touch with Sarang and finds out that Sarang is in Mumbai. They manage to contact each other and make a deal for getting and keeping Sarang in Mathura. Sarang gets warned by his mother to not come back to Mathura as his father is behaving weird. He however, disobeys to her when asked by Alia to come to Mathura as he realises that he is in love with her. After reaching Mathura and meeting with his father, Alia realizes her mistake and tries to make up an excuse to take Sarang back with her but fails. Sarang, who was disguised as a Punjabi, gets recognized by his family and not long after, a family drama starts, during which Alia faints due to the mayhem. A doctor is called who, bribed by Brij, advises her that she shouldn't travel but rest in Mathura instead for a minimum of three weeks. Brij also invites his strictly traditional and old-fashioned elder sister to stay with them. She bring along with her, Sarang's childhood friend, Elaichi, whom he doesn't recognise at first, to marry him. She also realizes that Sarang is in love with Alia but keeps it just between herself, Brij and Elaichi.

Due to her strict rules of following traditions, Sarang's aunt (or "Bua") would often get into arguments with Alia, who believes that change is inevitable in life and she (Bua) should change her ways of thinking too. During one such argument, Alia's hand gets injured. Sarang provides her with first-aid but his mother overhears their conversation by which she realizes that Sarang is the going-to-be father of Alia's child. Sarang takes her to another room and explains to her the whole story of how he became father, while Alia plans on leaving. Sarang's mother supports her decision of leaving, packs Sarang's old clothes and toys for the baby, and immediately calls a cab. This left Sarang very unhappy and emotional, and he planned to leave the house too but changed his mind after seeing Alia return. Alia returned because during her taxi ride, she saw a childhood painting of herself, among the toys Sarang's mother gifted, with the "sweet" boy whom she met as a kid while she was on her way to boarding school, whom she then realizes is a very young Sarang. She realizes that she has feelings for Sarang but is unsure of it. Soon after, Sarang tells his mother of how he feels for Alia, and Alia perceives that she is in love with Sarang during a phone-call conversation with Rabia. She informs Sarang that they are going to be parents of twins and also that Kumkum is pregnant (she realized this a few days back when she found Kumkum craving food in the middle of the night, but promised not to tell anybody). Then, after playing pranks on each other, they confess their love to each other and plan to go back to Mumbai. Meanwhile, Suraj hires people to kidnap Brij so that he can tell him about the baby, and on the other side, Bua and Elaichi discover that Sarang is the father of Alia's child. As soon as Brij is left loose by Suraj, he teams up with Bua and Elaichi to get rid of the baby (here, while Brij is talking about Kumkum's baby, Bua and Elaichi are under the impression of killing that of Sarang and Alia's). Brij gets Suraj arrested for kidnapping him but his decision is overturned after Sarang and Alia slyly trap him. Not long after, Bua and Elaichi inform him that the baby they wanted to be killed was that of Alia's since Sarang is the father. Meanwhile, Gautam and Nandini realize their irresponsibility and go to Mathura. While everyone gets to know about Alia and Sarang, including Gautam and Nandini, Brij decides to get them married on grounds of tradition. Regarding this Alia has a conflict with Sarang about if he hurted her like Veer on which Sarang gets upset and Alia tries to make him happy and they both agree on getting engaged. In the meantime, Alia forgives and reconciles with her mother after learning the true story of her childhood. Gautam and Brij Mohan are secretly trying to break off their relationship by various different schemes. Soon Alia and Sarang decide to go back to Mumbai and not let anyone know about their relationship there, mainly on Sarang's insistence. However, soon as Sarang's family comes to Mumbai, masterminded by Bua, Brij Mohan, Gautam and Elaichi, to disrupt Alia and Sarang's relationship. Elaichi goes missing one day and while Sarang and Alia were searching for her, Alia gets gravely injured in a car accident. Sarang makes a heartfelt video on his Facebook account, begging people to donate blood to save her life and the babies and to everyone's surprise, Elaichi is later found to be the donor. This injury made Alia's pregnancy a high-risk one, which she requests Rabia to keep a secret from everyone, especially Sarang to not worry him. Meanwhile, Faheem suspects that there is something going on between Alia and Sarang and starts investigating, while trying to frame Sarang into various incidents, and soon Alia tells everyone about their relationship, much to Sarang's dismay. Soon after, Sarang goes missing and his workplace is found vandalized the next morning. Meanwhile, Brij Mohan is beaten up and is found unconscious by Kusum and her husband. Alia soon finds Sarang injured in a warehouse with the help of the police, who later arrest Suraj's father on account of kidnapping him. Sarang is admitted to a hospital after being rescued where with Alia, they make vows and promise to love each other and stay together forever. Soon after, Sarang receives a call from Mr. Mehta to write for his new film which Sarang accepts and goes out of the city to start work, while beginning to avoid Alia. Meanwhile, the families are preparing for Sarang and Alia's wedding but multiple abshagun (ominous events) occur throughout the pre-wedding functions hinting that the wedding won't happen.

6 years later

Alia and Sarang have indeed separated and it is revealed their marriage never happened as they decided to part ways days before the wedding. Alia stays with her son Agastya in Mumbai and Sarang with his daughter Sayuri in Mathura. Alia sold her company Direct Dil Se and is now struggling financially. She now works as an employee in DDS where Jeevan Srivastava, an investor, is the new boss. Sarang writes children's comics under the pen name of 'Azaad Roy' which have become very famous but nobody knows his real identity. Kavya has become his secretary but still has feelings for him. Alia and Sarang, anonymously and unbeknownst to each other, get in touch with each other on an online platform for single parents and begin to share their day-to-day experiences, to the point that both agree to meet each other. Agastya, who is bullied in his school, is a big fan of Azaad Roy's comics and wishes to meet him and requests Alia to take him to meet Azaad Roy. Sayuri, who was a bully, was born with a heart defect as a result of Alia's car accident six years ago and now her condition has started to deteriorate. Her doctor in Mathura informs Sarang that she has to be taken to Mumbai for further specialist treatment. Sarang, Sayuri and Kamleshwari go to Mumbai and stay at Sarang's old house where his previous roommate and old friend Ramesh bhau still lives. It is revealed both Sarang and Alia don't know about the other twin's existence who they think was born dead. Alia and Sarang have many chance encounters with Sayuri and Agastya respectively and each start to develop strong parental feelings for the other, still unaware that both are meeting their long-lost kid. Agastya and Sayuri (who was enrolled in the same school as him), after a few unpleasant interactions, decide to become friends. Alia is working really hard to market Azaad Roy's comic characters "Papa Toofan" (Father Storm) and "Chhotu Toofan" (Little Storm) to make them accessible for kids of all ages and tries to get in contact with Azaad Roy.

Meanwhile, Kamleshwari wants to understand the circumstances under which Sarang and Alia separated and, with the help of Ramesh, decides to meet Alia behind Sarang's back as he has prohibited the very mention of Alia's name in their household. Kamleshwari finally gets in touch with Nandini Sharma, who lives in the US because of her ongoing treatment for cancer. However, Sarang finds out about this and angrily asks her to never contact Nandini again. Gautam wants to see Alia happy and believes that her ex-husband Veer could bring that happiness. So, he secretly instructs Veer to join DDS as the CEO to slowly win over Alia by gaining her sympathy over the loss of his wife Nitya and their child.

One day, Rahul and Mala (now married) come up with a plan to make Alia happy and rope in Rosie and few others to contact Alia's former employees and investors to join another company that they hope Alia will eventually establish. During one such day, Faheem shows up in Param's office in search of a job. He is asked to leave immediately as it was revealed that Faheem had been imprisoned for a long time as a result of an unnamed serious crime, while being given an assurance of consideration.

While chatting online with each other, one day, both Alia and Sarang come to know that their kids share the same birthday and agree to prepare something special for them with the hope of meeting afterwards.

Cast

Main 
 Sukirti Kandpal as Alia Shroff – Founder and CEO-turned-employee at Direct Dil Se (DDS); Gautam and Nandini's daughter; Veer's ex-wife; Sarangdhar's ex-fiancée; Agastya and Sayuri's mother. (2020–2021)
 Aashay Mishra as Sarangdhar "Sarang" Pandey / Azaad Roy – Kamaleshwari and Brij Mohan's son; Kusum and Kumkum's brother; Alia's ex-fiancé; Agastya and Sayuri's father. (2020–2021)

Recurring 
 Dadhir Pandey as Brij Mohan Pandey – Kamleshwari's husband; Kusum, Kumkum and Sarangdhar's father; Agastya and Sayuri's grandfather (2020–2021)
 Kanupriya Pandit as Kamaleshwari Pandey – Brij Mohan's wife; Kusum, Kumkum and Sarangdhar's mother; Agastya and Sayuri's grandmother (2020–2021)
 Monaa Mokhha as Kusum Pandey – Kamleshwari and Brij Mohan's elder daughter; Kumkum and Sarangdhar's sister; Pawan's wife (2020–2021)
 Sharat Sonu as Pawan – Kusum's husband (2020–2021)
 Anusubdha Bhagat as Kumkum Pandey – Kamleshwari and Brij Mohan's younger daughter; Kusum and Sarangdhar's sister; Suraj's wife (2020–2021)
 Rajan Singh as Suraj – Kumkum's husband (2020–2021)
 Hridaan Choudhary as Agastya "Aggu" Shroff – Alia and Sarangdhar's son; Sayuri's twin brother (2021)
 Avni Taywade as Sayuri "Chhoti" Pandey – Alia and Sarangdhar's daughter; Agastya's twin sister (2021)
 Ashish Nayyar as Gautam Shroff – Nandini's husband; Alia's father; Agastya and Sayuri's grandfather (2020–2021)
 Komal Chhabria as Nandini Sharma Shroff – Gautam's wife; Alia's mother; Agastya and Sayuri's grandmother (2020–2021)
 Bhumika Chheda as Dr. Rabia Ahmed – Alia's gynecologist and bestfriend (2020–2021)
 Tanvi Prabha as Sunita – Alia's housekeeper (2020–2021)
 Anant V Joshi as Veer Malhotra – New CEO of DDS; Alia's ex–husband; Nitya's fiancé. (2020–2021)
 Vidhi Chitalia as Nitya – Alia's friend; Veer's fiancée (2020–2021)
 Shruti Prakash as Kavya – Owner of Kavya's Green Café; Sarangdhar's friend; Vishu's sister (2020–2021)
 Mohit Tiwari as Vishu – Kavya's brother (2020–2021)
 Sayantan Banerjee as Parom Chakroborty – DDS's HR (2020–2021)
 Nabeel Ahmed Mirajkar as Faheem Saudagar – DDS's writer (2020–2021)
 Rajesh Singh as Rakesh – Sarangdhar's friend (2020–21)
 Kalpana Rao as Scarlett – DDS's receptionist (2020–21)
 Pooja Jadhav as Mala – DDS's employee (2020–21)
 Hardik Thakkar as Rahul – DDS's employee (2020–21)
Sam as Sam – DDS's employee (2020–21)
 Nimesh Balaji Shinde as Ramesh Bhau – Sarangdhar's friend and roommate (2020–21)
 Shivanshu Sharma as Sarangdhar's friend (2020–21)
 Suryansh Patel as Suleiman – Sarangdhar's friend and roommate (2020–21)
 Deepak Soni as Gurupal: Sarangdhar's friend and roommate (2020–21)
 Kaushiki Rathore as Elaichi: Sarang's childhood friend (2021)
 Kavita Vaid as Buaji (2021)
 Aditya Jha as Chotelaal (2020)

Episodes

Reception
News18 termed the storyline of the show 'progressive'. The show was lauded by film producer Farah Khan and actress Anita Hassanandani for delving into the subject of motherhood through IVF and supporting a woman's choice to be a mother.

Ratings 

In UK, show launched with 10,400 viewers on 23 November 2020 but showed significant increase with 55,300 viewers next day (24 November 2020), finishing the week with 37,200 viewers and third place for Sony TV on 26 November 2020. During its second week of airing, show gained highest 55,400 viewers on Tuesday (1 December 2020), ranking first on Sony TV and third overall. Show retained its place in Top-5 shows in UK during the rest of the week with 42,800 viewers on Wednesday (2 December 2020) and 43,700 viewers on Thursday (3 December 2020).

References

External links
 
 Story 9 Months Ki on Sony Liv

Hindi-language television shows
Indian drama television series
Indian television soap operas
Sony Entertainment Television original programming
2020 Indian television series debuts